"Dream On" is a song by the British musical group Depeche Mode. It was released in the United States on 17 April 2001 and in the united Kingdom on 23 April 2001 as the first single from the band's 10th studio album, Exciter (2001). The song topped the charts of Denmark, Germany, Italy, and Spain and reached the top 10 in Austria, Canada, Finland, Norway, Portugal, Sweden, the United Kingdom, and Wallonia. The song's music video was directed by Stéphane Sednaoui.

Critical reception
In a review for Billboard magazine, Eric Aiese said of "Dream On", "It's hard to remember the last time the group did anything so organic, and 'Dream On' proves to be surprisingly refreshing. The guitar line is a catchy head-bobber, and the minimal melody sounds like a winner". Another review from the same magazine called the track "rock-solid". The song is rated three out of five stars on AllMusic, with reviewer Ned Raggett comparing the composition to works by Timbaland and noting that Dave Gahan's lyrical delivery was "one of his best".

Music & Media named it their "Pick of the Week" on their 7 April 2001 issue, with Ville Vilén of Radiomafia complimenting the "classic" songwriting with its "modern" sound. Kristian Bartos of Swedish radio station WOW! 105.5 said that although the song would take a second listen to appreciate fully, it would become a "long-lasting" single. Sandra Boussu, head of music at FM Limburg in Belgium, gave the song a positive review but doubted that "Dream On" would become a hit Europe, citing Depeche Mode's stylistic changes. British trade paper Music Week compared the song to Björk's album Homogenic (1997), noting its "nagging acoustics" and "slithery dark beats".

Chart performance
In the band's native United Kingdom, "Dream On" debuted at its peak of number six on the week beginning 29 April 2001, topping the UK Indie Singles Chart the same week. It quickly fell down the UK Singles Chart after its debut, staying in the top 40 for only two weeks and the top 100 for nine weeks. In Ireland, it debuted on the Irish Singles Chart on 26 April, peaking at number 24 and spending two weeks on the chart. Across Europe, the single made chart-topping debuts in Denmark, Germany, Italy, and Spain, staying one week at the top in the first three countries and remaining at number one for three weeks in Spain. In Finland, Hungary, Portugal, and Sweden, the track reached the top five, while in Austria, Greece, Norway, and the Wallonia region of Belgium, it charted within the top 10. It additionally became a top-40 hit in Flanders, France, the Netherlands, and Switzerland. On the Eurochart Hot 100, it reached number five.

Outside Europe, the song managed to chart in the United States and Canada. In the latter country, it first appeared on the Canadian Singles Chart at number two, its peak, on the issue dated 19 May 2001. In the United States, "Dream On" reached number one on both the Billboard Hot Dance Music/Maxi-Singles Sales and Dance Music/Club Play Singles charts; on the former listing, the single became their second number-one hit, after "Policy of Truth" in 1990. On the Billboard Hot 100, it peaked at number 85 on 12 May, totalling 10 weeks in the top 100. It also peaked within the top 20 on the Adult Alternative Songs, Adult Top 40, and Modern Rock Tracks charts.

Track listings

UK maxi-CD single – Mute (BONG 30)
"Dream On" (single version) – 3:41
"Easy Tiger" (full version) – 4:56
"Easy Tiger" (Bertrand Burgalat & A.S. Dragon Version) – 4:51

European 12-inch maxi-single – Mute/Virgin (8975356)
A1. "Dream On" (Bushwacka Tough Guy Mix) – 6:08
B1. "Dream On" (Dave Clarke Remix) – 5:14
B2. "Dream On" (Bushwacka Blunt Mix) – 6:49

European CD single – Mute/Virgin (7243 8975362 2)
"Dream On" (Bushwacka Tough Guy Mix)
"Dream On" (Dave Clarke Acoustic Version)
"Dream On" (Octagon Man Mix)
"Dream On" (Kid 606 Mix)

7-inch single – Reprise (7-16732)
A1. "Dream On" (edit) – 3:39
B1. "I Feel Loved" (single version) – 3:37

Canadian maxi-CD single – Reprise/Mute (CD 44982)
"Dream On" (single version) – 3:39
"Easy Tiger" (Bertrand Burgalat & A.S. Dragon Version) – 4:52
"Dream On" (Bushwacka Tough Guy Vocal Mix) – 6:07
"Dream On" (Bushwacka Blunt Mix) – 6:47
"Dream On" (Dave Clarke Club Mix) – 5:13

Personnel
Credits are lifted from the UK CD single liner notes.
Martin L. Gore – writing
Mark Bell – production
Gareth Jones – engineering, pre-production, additional production
Paul Freegard – pre-production, additional production
Steve Fitzmaurice – mixing
Anton Corbijn – photography, cover art, art direction
Form – design
Jonathan Kessler – management
JD Fanger – Depeche Mode office

Charts

Weekly charts

Year-end charts

Certifications

Release history

See also
List of number-one songs of the 2000s (Denmark)
List of number-one hits of 2001 (Germany)
List of number-one hits of 2001 (Italy)
List of number-one singles of 2001 (Spain)
List of number-one dance singles of 2001 (U.S.)

References

External links
Single information from the official Depeche Mode web site

2001 singles
2001 songs
Depeche Mode songs
Electronica songs
Music videos directed by Stéphane Sednaoui
Mute Records singles
Number-one singles in Denmark
Number-one singles in Germany
Number-one singles in Italy
Number-one singles in Spain
Reprise Records singles
Songs written by Martin Gore
UK Independent Singles Chart number-one singles
Virgin Records singles